Emmaus College may refer to:

Australia
 Emmaus College, Melbourne a Roman Catholic secondary day school in Melbourne, Victoria, Australia
 Emmaus College, Rockhampton, a Roman Catholic secondary day school in Park Avenue, Queensland, Australia
 Emmaus Bible College (Australia) a Bible College located in a suburb of Sydney, New South Wales

United States
 Emmaus High School, a public high school in Emmaus, Pennsylvania, U.S.
 Emmaus Bible College (Iowa), a private college in Dubuque, Iowa, U.S.